Anaida Poilievre (born 1986 or 1987) is a Canadian political staffer, online magazine publisher, and the wife of Conservative Party of Canada leader Pierre Poilievre.

Early life and education 
Poilievre was born in 1986 or 1987 Caracas, Venezuela to a father who was a bank manager. In 1995, when she was eight years old, her family moved to Montreal. In Montreal her father worked collecting fruit and vegetables at a farm.

She studied communications at the University of Ottawa.

Poilievre speaks English, French, and Spanish.

Career 
After working in retail and customer service roles, in 2008, aged 20 years, she was employed as a parliamentary affairs Advisor at the Senate of Canada before taking a job in the House of Commons of Canada. In 2013, she started a job working for Claude Carignan as a foreign affairs advisor.

She is a co-founder of Pretty and Smart Co online lifestyle magazine.

Personal life and views 

She married Pierre Poilievre in 2017 in Sintra, Portugal. Early in the COVID-19 pandemic she supported restrictions, switching to repeat her husband's Tweets that were critical of government public health measures in Canada later. 

Poilievre and her husband have two children. Poilievre and her family live in Greely, Ontario and she owns a property in Orleans, Ottawa.

Rape threats 
In September 2022, Jeremy MacKenzie, the far-right leader of Diagolon online community, spoke about raping Poilievre. Poilievre's husband Pierre referred the comments to the Royal Canadian Mounted Police (RCMP). Prime Minister Justin Trudeau said: "No one should ever be subject to threats of violence or the kind of hatred we’ve seen increasingly... It's important that we all stand up and condemn that." The RCMP are investigating the report.

References

External links 
 

Living people
Canadian people of Venezuelan descent
Venezuelan emigrants to Canada
People from Caracas
People from Montreal
University of Ottawa alumni
Canadian civil servants
Spouses of Canadian politicians
1980s births